was the inaugural Tokyo Joshi Pro professional wrestling event produced by Tokyo Joshi Pro-Wrestling (TJPW). It took place on January 4, 2016, at the Korakuen Hall in Tokyo, Japan.

In the event, TJPW crowned their first Tokyo Princess of Princess Champion where Miyu Yamashita defeated Shoko Nakajima in the main event.

Production

Background 
On January 3, 2016, TJPW revealed the Tokyo Princess of Princess Championship, TJPW's first title, which would be battled between Miyu Yamashita and Shoko Nakajima.

Results

References 

2016 in professional wrestling
2016 in Tokyo
Women's professional wrestling shows
Professional wrestling in Tokyo